Shurab or Shur Ab may refer to:

Afghanistan
Shurab, Afghanistan

Iran

Chaharmahal and Bakhtiari Province
Shur Ab, Chaharmahal and Bakhtiari, a village in Lordegan County
Shurab-e Kabir, a village in Shahrekord County
Shurab-e Saghir, a village in Shahrekord County
Shurab-e Tangazi Rural District

Fars Province
Shurab, Arsanjan, a village in Arsanjan County
Shurab Rural District (Fars Province), in Arsanjan County
Shurab-e Lor, a village in Mamasani County
Shurab-e Tork, a village in Mamasani County
Shurab-e Zar, a village in Mamasani County
Shur Ab, Shiraz, a village in Shiraz County

Ilam Province
Shurab-e Khan Ali, a village in Shirvan and Chardaval County

Isfahan Province
Shurab, Isfahan, a village in Kashan County

Kerman Province
Shur Ab, Jiroft, a village in Jiroft County
Shurab, Rigan, a village in Rigan County
Shurab, Rudbar-e Jonubi, a village in Rudbar-e Jonubi County

Kurdistan Province
Shurab-e Hajji, a village in Qorveh County
Shur Ab-e Hezareh, a village in Qorveh County
Shurab Khan, a village in Qorveh County

Lorestan Province
Shurab-e Mahmudvand, a village in Dowreh County
Shurab-e Najm-e Soheyli, a village in Dowreh County
Shurab-e Olya, Lorestan, a village in Dowreh County
Shurab Rural District (Lorestan Province), Iran

Mazandaran Province
Shur Ab, Mazandaran, a village in Savadkuh County
Shur Ab, Neka, a village in Neka County

Qazvin Province
Shur Ab, Qazvin, a village in Buin Zahra County

Qom Province
Shurab, Qom, a village in Qom County

Razavi Khorasan Province
Shurab-e Olya, Fariman, a village in Fariman County
Shurab-e Sofla, a village in Fariman County
Shurab, Firuzeh, a village in Firuzeh County
Shuryab, a village in Firuzeh County
Shurab, Gonabad, a village in Gonabad County
Shur Ab, Khalilabad, a village in Khalilabad County
Shurab, Tus, a village in Mashhad County
Shur Ab-e Olya, Sarakhs, a village in Sarakhs County
Shur Ab-e Sofla, a village in Sarakhs County
Shur Ab-e Vosta, a village in Sarakhs County
Shurab, Torbat-e Jam, a village in Torbat-e Jam County
Shurab-e Jahan, a village in Torbat-e Jam County
Shurab-e Olya, Torbat-e Jam, a village in Torbat-e Jam County
Shurab, Zaveh, a village in Zaveh County

Sistan and Baluchestan Province
Shurab, Sistan and Baluchestan, a village in Iranshahr County

South Khorasan Province
Shur Ab, Birjand, a village in Birjand County

West Azerbaijan Province
Shur Ab, West Azerbaijan, a village in Khoy County

Yazd Province

Zanjan Province
Shur Ab, Ijrud, a village in Ijrud County
Shur Ab, Khodabandeh, a village in Khodabandeh County
Shur Ab, Tarom, a village in Tarom County

Tajikistan
Shurab, Tajikistan